Asiceratinops is a genus of Asian dwarf spiders that was first described by K. Y. Eskov in 1992.  it contains only two species: A. amurensis and A. kolymensis.

See also
 List of Linyphiidae species

References

Araneomorphae genera
Linyphiidae
Spiders of Russia